1st Issue Special was a comics anthology series from DC Comics, done in a similar style to their Showcase series. It was published from April 1975 to April 1976. The goal was to showcase a new possible first issue of an ongoing series each month, with some issues debuting new characters and others reviving dormant series from DC's past. No series were actually launched from 1st Issue Special but the Warlord made his first appearance in the title and the character's ongoing series was already slated to debut a few months later.

Publication history
Writer Gerry Conway explained the series' origin: "1st Issue Special was a peculiar book concept based on [publisher] Carmine Infantino's observation that first issues of titles often sold better than subsequent issues. Carmine’s brainstorm: a monthly series of nothing but first issues. It sounds like a joke, but he was dead serious".

Conway has also denied that 1st Issue Special was a tryout series, pointing out that tryout series run each feature for several issues so that the publisher has enough time to get sales figures before deciding whether to give the feature its own series; since each feature in 1st Issue Special ran only one issue, DC would have had to either launch the new series before sales figures came in for the tryout (thus making the feature's appearance in 1st Issue Special pointless) or launch the new series six months or more after the tryout issue (by which time reader interest in the feature would have faded). Conway added: "We used to sit at editorial meetings and [Carmine Infantino] would say, 'Who has an idea for 1st Issue Special next month?' How do you develop a project that has a potential to be a real series within 20 days? You can't". Only two of the 1st Issue Special features received an ongoing series: Mike Grell's The Warlord, which first appeared in issue #8 (November 1975), and Gerry Conway and Mike Vosburg's Return of the New Gods, which appeared in issue #13.

Issues #1 (featuring Atlas) featured art and story by Jack Kirby. A number of issues featured existing DC characters: issue #3, Metamorpho, issue #5, Manhunter, issue #7, the Creeper, issue #9, the Golden Age character Doctor Fate, and issue #13, the New Gods. The Metamorpho feature reunited the character's creators, writer Bob Haney and artist Ramona Fradon. Haney and Fradon had met at the 1974 San Diego Comic-Con, and while reminiscing, it emerged that both of them regarded Metamorpho as one of the features they had most enjoyed working on, leading them to ask DC if they could do one more Metamorpho story together. 1st Issue Special staff have not been able to answer why the Creeper story was illustrated but not written by the character's creator, Steve Ditko.

Issue #12 featured a new Starman character which would later be used in James Robinson's 1990s series focused on the character Jack Knight. The character was a supporting player in Justice League: Cry for Justice in 2010.

Some stories which had been intended for publication in 1st Issue Special appeared in other titles instead. A Batgirl and Robin team-up was published in Batman Family #1 (September–October 1975) and a Green Arrow and Black Canary story was kept in inventory until it was published as a backup feature in Green Lantern #100 (January 1978).

1st Issue Special never printed a letters column, instead accompanying each feature with a "Story Behind the Story" text page.

List of stories and credits

Collected editions
 The Jack Kirby Omnibus Volume 2 includes the Atlas story from 1st Issue Special #1, the Manhunter story from #5, and the Dingbats of Danger Street story from #6, 624 pages, May 2013, 
 Showcase Presents: The Great Disaster featuring the Atomic Knights includes the Atlas story from 1st Issue Special #1, 576 pages, June 2014, 
 The Creeper by Steve Ditko includes the Creeper story from 1st Issue Special #7, 288 pages, April 2010, 
 The Warlord: The Savage Empire includes the Warlord story from 1st Issue Special #8, 240 pages, November 1991, 
 Showcase Presents: Warlord includes the Warlord story from 1st Issue Special #8, 528 pages, September 2009, 
 The Art of Walter Simonson includes the Doctor Fate story from 1st Issue Special #9, 208 pages, June 1989, 
DC’s 1st Issue Specials includes issues #1-13, 272 pages, March 2020,

See also
List of DC Comics publications

References

External links
 
 1st Issue Special at Mike's Amazing World of DC Comics

1975 comics debuts
1976 comics endings
Comics anthologies
Comics by Bob Haney
Comics by Dennis O'Neil
Comics by Gerry Conway
Comics by Jack Kirby
Comics by Michael Fleisher
Comics by Robert Kanigher
Comics by Steve Ditko
Comics by Walt Simonson
Defunct American comics
Superhero comics